Khilchipur is a town and a nagar panchayat in Rajgarh district in the Indian state of Madhya Pradesh.
In 2022 Janpad Panchayat election held in which BJP emerged as a winner and make their candidate Janpad Adhyaksh and up-adhyaksh under the leadership of Kunwar Hajarilal Dangi (Former BJP MLA of Khilchipur constituency).

History

Founded in 1544 by Dewan Ugra Sen, a Khichi Rajput. A Fort is also in the khilchipur which is situated near the gad ganga river.  A grant of land was made to him by the Mughal Emperor, which included the adjoining Jirapur and Machalpur parganas, later a part of Indore state, and Shujalpur, later in Gwalior state.
Currently Priyavrat Singh is owner of khilchipur fort. He is also a vidhayak MLA of khilchipur constituency. 
 Khilchipur is also known as prem nagari, 11 miles and many different aspects – its food, culture, its natural landscapes, its languages, classical dances, Brahmakumari spirituality and many more.
Khilchipur have some famous places like a Shani mandir where people come from nearby villages for blessings.
It also have Dangi Darwaja and a fort to visit.

Geography
It has an average elevation of 394 metres (1,292 feet).

Demographics
 India census Khilchipur had a population of 18,928. Males constitute 51% of the population and females 49%. Khilchipur has an average literacy rate of 61%, higher than the national average of 59.5%: male literacy is 72%, and female literacy is 51%. In Khilchipur, 16% of the population is under 6 years of age.
Khilchipur comes under the category of very backward place, economically it is very weak.
There is no railway station in khilchipur.

References

Cities and towns in Rajgarh district
Rajgarh, Madhya Pradesh